Sincerely Yours  may refer to:

Film
 Sincerely Yours (film), a 1955 American romantic music comedy featuring Liberace
 Sincerely Yours..., a 1985 Soviet comedy

Music
 Sincerely Yours (record label), a Swedish record label

Albums
 Sincerely Yours (Iamsu! album) or the title song, 2014
 Sincerely Yours (Jo Stafford album), 2006
 Sincerely Yours (Luv' album) or the title song, 1991
 Sincerely Yours (One Voice album), 2001
 Sincerely Yours (Bomb Zombies EP) or the title song, 2010
 Sincerely Yours, an EP by Teairra Marí, 2010

Songs
 "Sincerely Yours" (Kylie Minogue song), 2018
 "Sincerely Yours"/"Can You Feel the Power of Words", a double A-side single by Rina Aiuchi, 2002
 "Sincerely Yours", by Sweet Sensation from Take It While It's Hot, 1988

See also
 Yours Sincerely (disambiguation)
 Valediction